John Albert Kay is a Certified Electrical/Electronic Engineering Technologist in the province of Ontario, Canada.  Mr. Kay began work in the electronics field through the servicing and installation of large mainframe computers for Sperry Univac/Burroughs/Unisys. After over a decade employed with Sperry (Unisys), he began employment within Allen-Bradley/Rockwell Automation in Cambridge, ON, Canada. (He retired from Rockwell Automation Cambridge, Ontario in 2021). Mr. Kay became and IEEE member in 1994 and was elevated to Senior Member in 1998. Mr. Kay was named a Fellow of the Institute of Electrical and Electronics Engineers (IEEE) in 2012 for his contributions to arc resistant medium voltage control and protection technologies. He has served on several various IEEE executive positions including all of the executive roles on the IEEE Pulp and Paper Industry Committee. Mr. Kay serves on several other associated technical working groups including the Safety Subcommittee of the PPIC and various subcommittees of the IEEE Petroleum and Chemical Industry Committee (PCIC). He has participated on the local planning committees for the 2011 IEEE-PCIC and the 2002 IEEE-PPIC, both held in Toronto, ON, Canada. Mr. Kay has also served on the IEEE Industry Applications Society's (IAS) executive board as the Process Industry Department Chairman.  

Mr. Kay has authored and presented over 95 (and counting) award winning technical papers and published articles presented at global technical conferences including those for the Institute of Electrical and Electronic Engineers (IEEE), the Pulp and Paper Technical Association of Canada (PAPTAC), National Fire Prevention Association (NFPA) and Association for Iron & Steel Technology (AIST). Several of his technical papers and reports have been recognized with several special awards and have been published in global technical publications and magazines. He has also authored many Rockwell Automation internally published technical white papers including two corporate technical reference textbooks on Medium Voltage Motor Control Centers (MV MCC).

Awards 
2007 Meritorious Service Award, awarded by the Institute of Electrical and Electronics Engineers (IEEE), Industry Application Society, Pulp and Paper Technical Committee

2015 Farrington Award was presented by the Association for Iron and Steel (AIST), recognizing exceptional technical achievements in electrical applications 

2019 Outstanding Technical Contribution Award, awarded by the Institute of Electrical and Electronics Engineers (IEEE), Industry Application Society, Petroleum and Chemical Industry Committee

2020, The Odo J. Struger Award presented by Rockwell Automation, Milwaukee, WI. This award honors engineers for outstanding technical achievement in the field of industrial and electrical automation. It is the highest engineering award offered by Rockwell Automation. Mr. Kay is the first Canadian to receive this award.

2021 Electrical Safety Excellence Award, awarded by the Institute of Electrical and Electronics Engineers (IEEE), Industry Application Society, Petroleum and Chemical Industry Committee.

2021 George Burwash Langford Award, awarded by The Ontario Association of Certified Engineering Technicians and Technologists (OACETT) for leadership in making a place for technicians and technologists in the engineering spectrum. 

2021 Alumni of Distinction Recipients, Nominated and awarded by Conestoga College Alumni, Kitchener, Ontario. A scholarship at the college was also created in his name.

Publications, Technical Papers 
G. A. Hussain, W. Hassan, F. Mahmood and J. A. Kay, "Separation of Partial Discharge Faults in Metal-clad Switchgear Based on Pulse Shape Analysis," 2022 IEEE Electrical Insulation Conference (EIC), 2022, pp. 323-328, doi: 10.1109/EIC51169.2022.9833162.

J. A. Kay and D. C. Mazur, "A History of Paper Making Around Niagara Falls," 2022 IEEE IAS Pulp and Paper Industry Conference (PPIC), 2022, pp. 1-11, doi: 10.1109/PPIC52995.2022.9888813.

J. A. Kay, L. K. Padden and D. C. Mazur, "Medium Voltage Circuit Breakers and Contactors are not The Same - Neither are Their Protection Methods," 2022 IEEE IAS Pulp and Paper Industry Conference (PPIC), 2022, pp. 101-110, doi: 10.1109/PPIC52995.2022.9888917.

D. C. Mazur, R. A. Entzminger, J. A. Kay and C. A. Peterson, "ANALYSIS AND OVERVIEW OF MESSAGE QUEUEING TELEMETRY TRANSPORT (MQTT) AS APPLIED TO FOREST PRODUCTS APPLICATIONS," in IEEE Transactions on Industry Applications, 2022, doi: 10.1109/TIA.2022.3192424.

URL: http://ieeexplore.ieee.org/stamp/stamp.jsp?tp=&arnumber=9833322&isnumber=4957013

J. A. Kay and D. C. Mazur, "Hidden Hazard—Identifying, Understanding, and Preventing Combustible Dust Explosions in Forest Industry Facilities," in IEEE Transactions on Industry Applications, vol. 56, no. 4, pp. 3337-3349, July-Aug. 2020, doi: 10.1109/TIA.2020.2986709.

URL: http://ieeexplore.ieee.org/stamp/stamp.jsp?tp=&arnumber=9064667&isnumber=9143303

W. Hassan, F. Mahmood, G. A. Hussain, S. Amin and J. A. Kay, "Feature Extraction of Partial Discharges During Multiple Simultaneous Defects in Low-Voltage Electric Machines," in IEEE Transactions on Instrumentation and Measurement, vol. 70, pp. 1-10, 2021, Art no. 3523410. doi: 10.1109/TIM.2021.3101301.

URL: http://ieeexplore.ieee.org/stamp/stamp.jsp?tp=&arnumber=9521774&isnumber=9259274

J. A. Kay and L. K. Padden, "Review of the New IEEE Std. 3004.8 “Recommended Practice for Motor Protection in Industrial and Commercial Power Systems” With Focus on Forest Products Industries," in IEEE Transactions on Industry Applications, vol. 56, no. 4, pp. 3350-3358, July-Aug. 2020. doi: 10.1109/TIA.2020.2986672

keywords: {IEEE Standards;Induction motors;DC motors;Synchronous motors;Color;Relays;3004.8;adjustable speed drive;Buff Book;IEEE color book;motor condition monitoring;motor protection relay;motor protection},

URL: http://ieeexplore.ieee.org/stamp/stamp.jsp?tp=&arnumber=9064668&isnumber=9143303

D. C. Mazur, R. A. Entzminger, J. A. Kay and P. A. Morell, "Time Synchronization Mechanisms for the Industrial Marketplace," in IEEE Transactions on Industry Applications, vol. 53, no. 1, pp. 39-46, Jan.-Feb. 2017. doi: 10.1109/TIA.2016.2603464

URL: http://ieeexplore.ieee.org/stamp/stamp.jsp?tp=&arnumber=7553464&isnumber=7823061

L. R. Olsen, J. A. Kay and M. Van Krey, "Enhanced Safety Features in Motor Control Centers and Drives for Diagnostics and Troubleshooting," in IEEE Transactions on Industry Applications, vol. 51, no. 5, pp. 4255-4262, Sept.-Oct. 2015. doi: 10.1109/TIA.2015.2431636

URL: http://ieeexplore.ieee.org/stamp/stamp.jsp?tp=&arnumber=7105375&isnumber=7270373

J. A. Kay and S. Malik, "Impact of Improper Installation, Maintenance and Servicing of Electrical Equipment in Forest Products Industries," in IEEE Transactions on Industry Applications, vol. 56, no. 4, pp. 3359-3367, July-Aug. 2020. doi: 10.1109/TIA.2020.2987276

keywords: {Occupational safety;Injuries;Preventive maintenance;NFPA;Arc faults;arc flash;electrical equipment;electrical safety;installation;maintenance;NEC;NFPA-70;NFPA-70B;NFPA-70E;project management;risk management;safety;servicing},

URL: http://ieeexplore.ieee.org/stamp/stamp.jsp?tp=&arnumber=9069241&isnumber=9143303

J. A. Kay, D. C. Mazur and K. D. Mazur, "Differential Protection With Critical Motors and Motor Applications: What You Didn't Know," in IEEE Industry Applications Magazine, vol. 23, no. 6, pp. 62-70, Nov.-Dec. 2017. doi: 10.1109/MIAS.2016.2600691

keywords: {Circuit faults;Power transformers;Current transformers;Windings;Surge protection;Magnetic cores},

URL: http://ieeexplore.ieee.org/stamp/stamp.jsp?tp=&arnumber=8023754&isnumber=8063514

D. C. Mazur, J. A. Kay, C. Schmehl and B. K. Venne, "The Value of Integrating Power and Process in the Petrochemical Industry: Saving Money With One Visualization and Reporting Environment," in IEEE Industry Applications Magazine, vol. 26, no. 2, pp. 39-46, March-April 2020. doi: 10.1109/MIAS.2019.2943650

keywords: {Process control;Automation;Industries;Monitoring;Petrochemicals;Data visualization;IEC Standards},

URL: http://ieeexplore.ieee.org/stamp/stamp.jsp?tp=&arnumber=8936341&isnumber=8985359

D. C. Mazur, R. A. Entzminger, P. A. Morell, J. A. Kay and E. Syme, "Defining the Industrial Demilitarized Zone and Its Benefits for Mining Applications," in IEEE Transactions on Industry Applications, vol. 52, no. 3, pp. 2731-2736, May-June 2016. doi: 10.1109/TIA.2016.2530045

keywords: {Automation;Quality of service;Reconnaissance;Interviews;Jitter;Data mining;Industrial Demilitarized Zone (IDMZ);Defense In-Depth Security;Enterprise Zone;Industrial Zone;Virtual Local;Area Network (VLAN);Quality of Service (QoS);Defense in-depth security;enterprise zone;industrial demilitarized zone (IDMZ);industrial zone;quality of service (QoS);virtual local area network (VLAN)},

URL: http://ieeexplore.ieee.org/stamp/stamp.jsp?tp=&arnumber=7406704&isnumber=7471386

D. C. Mazur, R. A. Entzminger and J. A. Kay, "Enhancing Traditional Process SCADA and Historians for Industrial and Commercial Power Systems With Energy (Via IEC 61850)," in IEEE Transactions on Industry Applications, vol. 52, no. 1, pp. 76-82, Jan.-Feb. 2016. doi: 10.1109/TIA.2015.2463792

keywords: {Process control;Synchronization;Automation;Real-time systems;Servers;IEC standards;Production;International Electrotechnical Commission (IEC)61850;intelligent electronic device, process historian;Supervisory Control and Data Acquisition (SCADA);Historical data trending;intelligent electronic device (IED);International Electrotechnical Commission (IEC) 61850;Object Linking and Embedding Database (OLE DB);process historian;supervisory control and data acquisition (SCADA)},

URL: http://ieeexplore.ieee.org/stamp/stamp.jsp?tp=&arnumber=7174996&isnumber=7384815

T. Holliday and J. A. Kay, "Understanding Infrared Windows and Their Effects on Infrared Readings," in IEEE Transactions on Industry Applications, vol. 50, no. 4, pp. 2403-2409, July-Aug. 2014.

doi: 10.1109/TIA.2013.2295000

keywords: {Cameras;Calibration;Optical imaging;Optical reflection;Optical polymers;Temperature measurement;Infrared;Sightglass;IR;IR Window;Safety;Infrared (IR);IR window;safety;sightglass},

URL: http://ieeexplore.ieee.org/stamp/stamp.jsp?tp=&arnumber=6683002&isnumber=6855381

J. A. Kay, G. A. Hussain, M. Lehtonen and L. Kumpulainen, "New Preemptive Arc-Fault Detection Techniques in Medium-Voltage Switchgear and Motor Controls," in IEEE Transactions on Industry Applications, vol. 52, no. 1, pp. 740-750, Jan.-Feb. 2016. doi: 10.1109/TIA.2015.2466620

keywords: {Switchgear;Partial discharges;Discharges (electric);Discrete wavelet transforms;Power transformer insulation;Insulation;arc flash;arcing fault;switchgear;motor control center;proactive techniques;non-intrusive sensors;online condition monitoring;signal processing;discrete wavelet transform;Arc flash;arcing fault;discrete wavelet transform (DWT);motor control center (MCC);nonintrusive sensors;online condition monitoring;proactive techniques;signal processing;switchgear},

URL: http://ieeexplore.ieee.org/stamp/stamp.jsp?tp=&arnumber=7185430&isnumber=7384815

J. A. Kay, L. K. Padden, D. C. Mazur and H. Weber, "The Misuse of IEEE Device 52- Medium Voltage Contactors and Breakers Are Not the Same!," in IEEE Transactions on Industry Applications, vol. 53, no. 2, pp. 1646-1655, March-April 2017. doi: 10.1109/TIA.2016.2622678

keywords: {Circuit breakers;Contactors;Switching circuits;Interrupters;Vacuum arcs;Sulfur hexafluoride;Arc-resistant switchgear;circuit breaker;metal clad;metal enclosed;switchgear;vacuum circuit breaker;vacuum contactor;vacuum interrupter},

URL: http://ieeexplore.ieee.org/stamp/stamp.jsp?tp=&arnumber=7723842&isnumber=7880726

J. A. Kay, R. A. Entzminger and D. C. Mazur, "Industrial Ethernet: Overview and Application in the Forest Products Industry," in IEEE Industry Applications Magazine, vol. 21, no. 1, pp. 54-63, Jan.-Feb. 2015.

doi: 10.1109/MIAS.2014.2345835

keywords: {Optical fiber cables;Cable shielding;Protocols;Cable insulation;Standards;Optical fiber communication;Ethernet},

URL: http://ieeexplore.ieee.org/stamp/stamp.jsp?tp=&arnumber=6942159&isnumber=6978017

J. A. Kay, J. Arvola and L. Kumpulainen, "Protecting at the Speed of Light," in IEEE Industry Applications Magazine, vol. 17, no. 3, pp. 12-18, May-June 2011. doi: 10.1109/MIAS.2010.939635

keywords: {Arc discharges;Relays;Fault currents;Fuses;Optical fiber sensors;Optical fiber cables;Velocity control},

URL: http://ieeexplore.ieee.org/stamp/stamp.jsp?tp=&arnumber=5722008&isnumber=5746586

L. Kumpulainen, G. A. Hussain, M. Lehtonen and J. A. Kay, "Preemptive Arc Fault Detection Techniques in Switchgear and Controlgear," in IEEE Transactions on Industry Applications, vol. 49, no. 4, pp. 1911-1919, July-Aug. 2013. doi: 10.1109/TIA.2013.2258314

keywords: {Partial discharges;Materials;Switchgear;Acoustics;Insulation;Temperature sensors;Ionization;Arc flash;online monitoring;sensors},

URL: http://ieeexplore.ieee.org/stamp/stamp.jsp?tp=&arnumber=6504753&isnumber=6557466

D. C. Mazur, J. A. Kay and K. D. Mazur, "Intelligent Motor Control: Innovations in Process Optimization," in IEEE Industry Applications Magazine, vol. 21, no. 2, pp. 30-37, March-April 2015.

doi: 10.1109/MIAS.2014.2345828

keywords: {Process control;Safety;Security;SCADA systems;Technological innovation;Automation;Intelligent vehicles},

URL: http://ieeexplore.ieee.org/stamp/stamp.jsp?tp=&arnumber=6994445&isnumber=7035217

D. C. Mazur, J. A. Kay and K. D. Mazur, "Advancements in Vibration Monitoring for the Mining Industry," in IEEE Transactions on Industry Applications, vol. 51, no. 5, pp. 4321-4328, Sept.-Oct. 2015.

doi: 10.1109/TIA.2015.2416151

keywords: {Condition monitoring;Monitoring;Vibrations;Machinery;Automation;Standards;Condition monitoring (CM);Intelligent Motor Control (IMC);Integrated Architecture (IA);Medium Voltage (MV);Motor Control Center (MCC);Vibration Monitoring (VM);Condition monitoring (CM);integrated architecture (IA);intelligent motor control (IMC);medium voltage (MV);motor control center (MCC);vibration monitoring (VM)},

URL: http://ieeexplore.ieee.org/stamp/stamp.jsp?tp=&arnumber=7065301&isnumber=7270373

J. A. Kay and G. K. Schuster, "Enhanced Productivity With Lockout/Tagout Alternatives: Exploring Alternative Protective Measures," in IEEE Industry Applications Magazine, vol. 26, no. 4, pp. 32-38, July-Aug. 2020.

doi: 10.1109/MIAS.2020.2981096

keywords: {Risk management;IEC Standards;Productivity;Hazards;Machinery},

URL: http://ieeexplore.ieee.org/stamp/stamp.jsp?tp=&arnumber=9082202&isnumber=9113342

J. A. Kay, P. B. Sullivan and M. Wactor, "Arc-resistant motor control equipment," in IEEE Industry Applications Magazine, vol. 16, no. 1, pp. 57-64, January-February 2010.

doi: 10.1109/MIAS.2009.934969

keywords: {Motor drives;Testing;Medium voltage;History;Production facilities;Chemical products;Control equipment;Standards development;Manufacturing;Discrete event simulation},

URL: http://ieeexplore.ieee.org/stamp/stamp.jsp?tp=&arnumber=5353395&isnumber=5353380

J. A. Kay and L. Kumpulainen, "Maximizing Protection by Minimizing Arcing Times in Medium-Voltage Systems," in IEEE Transactions on Industry Applications, vol. 49, no. 4, pp. 1920-1927, July-Aug. 2013.

doi: 10.1109/TIA.2013.2255253

keywords: {Circuit breakers;Circuit faults;Relays;Fuses;Standards;Hazards;Optical sensors;Arc eliminator;arc fault;arc flash;arc-flash mitigation;current-limiting fuses;forest products;incident energy;pressure wave},

URL: http://ieeexplore.ieee.org/stamp/stamp.jsp?tp=&arnumber=6508904&isnumber=6557466

A. J. Holliday, J. A. Kay and L. Mason, "Using Infrared Sightglasses to Enable Predictive Maintenance of a High Voltage Motor System and Comply with NFPA70E Safety Requirements," 2008 IEEE Cement Industry Technical Conference Record, Miami, FL, USA, 2008, pp. 132-143.

doi: 10.1109/CITCON.2008.17

keywords: {Predictive maintenance;Voltage;Protection;Testing;Hazards;Inspection;Occupational safety;Protective clothing;Switchgear;Design engineering},

URL: http://ieeexplore.ieee.org/stamp/stamp.jsp?tp=&arnumber=4539612&isnumber=4539595

J. A. Kay, W. S. Hopper, A. J. Holliday and M. Higginson, "Infrared inspection in forest products processing environments," Conference Record of 2008 54th Annual Pulp and Paper Industry Technical Conference, Seattle, WA, USA, 2008, pp. 100-105.

doi: 10.1109/PAPCON.2008.4585817

keywords: {Inspection;Visualization;Cameras;Ducts;Industries;Maintenance engineering;Hazards;Forest products;sightglass;infrared;infrared windows;infrared ports;arc resistant;arc flash;arc flash;hazards;arcing},

URL: http://ieeexplore.ieee.org/stamp/stamp.jsp?tp=&arnumber=4585817&isnumber=4585798

A. J. Holliday and J. A. Kay, "IR sightglasses protect against arc-flash exposure," in IEEE Industry Applications Magazine, vol. 13, no. 3, pp. 59-68, May-June 2007.

doi: 10.1109/MIA.2007.353666

keywords: {Protection;Cotton;Fabrics;Injuries;Fires;Electrical safety;Employment;Protective clothing;Materials testing;Hazards},

URL: http://ieeexplore.ieee.org/stamp/stamp.jsp?tp=&arnumber=4168539&isnumber=4168519

D. C. Mazur, R. A. Entzminger, J. A. Kay and C. A. Peterson, "Analysis and Overview of Message Queueing Telemetry Transport (MQTT) as Applied to Forest Products Applications," 2021 IEEE IAS Pulp and Paper Industry Conference (PPIC), Niagara Falls, ON, Canada, 2021, pp. 1-7.

doi: 10.1109/PPIC47846.2021.9620403

keywords: {Pulp and paper industry;Industries;Data security;Data integrity;Process control;Forestry;Telemetry;MQTT;Queueing;Data Abstraction;Data Integrity;Data Security;Reporting Asset Schemas;Process Control},

URL: http://ieeexplore.ieee.org/stamp/stamp.jsp?tp=&arnumber=9620403&isnumber=9620264

J. A. Kay, J. Arvola and L. Kumpulainen, "Protecting at the speed of light: Combining arc flash sensing and arc-resistant technologies," Conference Record of 2010 Annual Pulp & Paper Industry Technical Conference, San Antonio, TX, USA, 2010, pp. 1-7.

doi: 10.1109/PAPCON.2010.5556507

keywords: {Arc discharges;Sensors;Relays;Fault currents;Low voltage;Fuses;Limiting;arc faults;arc flash;arc resistant equipment;arc sensors;controlgear;optical arc detection;switchgear;forest product industry},

URL: http://ieeexplore.ieee.org/stamp/stamp.jsp?tp=&arnumber=5556507&isnumber=5556496

J. A. Kay, J. Arvola and L. Kumpulainen, "Protection at the speed of light: Arc-flash protection combining arc flash sensing and arc-resistant technologies," 2009 Record of Conference Papers - Industry Applications Society 56th Annual Petroleum and Chemical Industry Conference, Anaheim, CA, USA, 2009, pp. 1-7.

doi: 10.1109/PCICON.2009.5297148

keywords: {Protection;Fault currents;Personnel;Immune system;Plasma temperature;Switchgear;Optical sensors;Optical control;Fault detection;Optical losses;arc faults;arc flash;arc resistant equipment;arc sensors;controlgear;optical arc detection;switchgear},

URL: http://ieeexplore.ieee.org/stamp/stamp.jsp?tp=&arnumber=5297148&isnumber=5297140

J. A. Kay, "Meeting the standards - Testing and certification of medium-voltage control centers to arc-resistance standards," in IEEE Industry Applications Magazine, vol. 13, no. 5, pp. 49-58, Sept.-Oct. 2007.

doi: 10.1109/MIA.2007.901383

keywords: {Testing;Certification;Medium voltage;IEC standards;Circuit faults;Fault currents;Protection;Switchgear;Impedance;Control systems},

URL: http://ieeexplore.ieee.org/stamp/stamp.jsp?tp=&arnumber=4294262&isnumber=4293257

R. Paes, J. A. Kay and B. Cassimere, "Applying Arc-Resistant Technologies to Medium-Voltage Variable Frequency Drives," in IEEE Transactions on Industry Applications, vol. 54, no. 2, pp. 1930-1937, March-April 2018.

doi: 10.1109/TIA.2017.2761824

keywords: {Testing;Resistance;IEC Standards;Medium voltage;Switchgear;Variable speed drives;Arc fault;arc flash;arc resistant;controlgear;control equipment;medium voltage;motor control;switchgear;variable frequency drives;variable speed drives},

URL: http://ieeexplore.ieee.org/stamp/stamp.jsp?tp=&arnumber=8063960&isnumber=8319543

J. A. Kay, D. C. Mazur and R. A. Entzminger, "Basics of Communication Networks for Electrical Engineers in the Forest Products Industries," 2018 IEEE IAS Pulp, Paper and Forest Industries Conference (PPFIC), Appleton, WI, USA, 2018, pp. 1-5.

doi: 10.1109/PPIC.2018.8502239

keywords: {Communications;Protocols;Networks;Media;Ethernet;Modbus;61850;RS232;RS485;USB},

URL: http://ieeexplore.ieee.org/stamp/stamp.jsp?tp=&arnumber=8502239&isnumber=8502184

D. C. Mazur, J. A. Kay and J. H. Kreiter, "Benefits of IEC 61850 standard for power monitoring and management systems in forest products industries," Conference Record of 2013 Annual IEEE Pulp and Paper Industry Technical Conference (PPIC), Charlotte, NC, USA, 2013, pp. 69-75.

doi: 10.1109/PPIC.2013.6656046

keywords: {Monitoring;Switches;Process control;Frequency measurement;Protocols;Atmospheric measurements;International Electrotechnical Commission (IEC) 61850;Programmable Automation Controller (PAC);Ethernet;EtherNet/IP;Protective Relay;MMS;GOOSE;SCADA},

URL: http://ieeexplore.ieee.org/stamp/stamp.jsp?tp=&arnumber=6656046&isnumber=6656031

J. A. Kay, "Considerations for installing and applying arc resistant low and medium voltage control equipment in forest products industries," Conference Record of 2009 Annual Pulp and Paper Industry Technical Conference, Birmingham, AL, USA, 2009, pp. 114-120.

doi: 10.1109/PAPCON.2009.5185415

keywords: {Medium voltage;Control equipment;Industrial control;Immune system;Protection;Electrical safety;Electrical equipment industry;Electrical products industry;Safety devices;Low voltage;arc resistant;C37.20.7;CSA-Z462;control equipment;control gear;incident energy;installation practices;low voltage;MCC;medium voltage;NFPA-70E;switchgear},

URL: http://ieeexplore.ieee.org/stamp/stamp.jsp?tp=&arnumber=5185415&isnumber=5185400

D. C. Mazur, R. A. Entzminger, J. A. Kay and P. A. Morell, "Time synchronization mechanisms for the industrial marketplace," 2015 IEEE/IAS 51st Industrial & Commercial Power Systems Technical Conference (I&CPS), Calgary, AB, Canada, 2015, pp. 1-7.

doi: 10.1109/ICPS.2015.7266440

keywords: {Satellites;Area measurement;Coordinate measuring machines;Real-time systems;Global Positioning System;Authentication;International Electrotechnical Commission (IEC) 61850;intelligent electronic device;Inter-Range Instrumentation Group (IRIG);Global Positioning System (GPS);Network Time Protocol (NTP);Precision Time Protocol (PTP);Supervisory Control and Data Acquisition (SCADA)},

URL: http://ieeexplore.ieee.org/stamp/stamp.jsp?tp=&arnumber=7266440&isnumber=7266399

T. Holliday and J. A. Kay, "Inaccuracies introduced using infrared windows and cameras," 2014 IEEE Petroleum and Chemical Industry Technical Conference (PCIC), San Francisco, CA, USA, 2014, pp. 53-59.

doi: 10.1109/PCICon.2014.6961918

keywords: {Cameras;Temperature measurement;Adaptive optics;Optical imaging;Optical filters;Arrays;Plastics;Infrared Windows;IR;Thermal Imagers;Infrared Cameras;NFPA70E;CSA Z462;Arc Flash;Preventive Maintenance;PdM;Predictive Maintenance},

URL: http://ieeexplore.ieee.org/stamp/stamp.jsp?tp=&arnumber=6961918&isnumber=6961868

D. C. Mazur, J. A. Kay, C. Schmehl and B. K. Venné, "The Value of Integrating Power and Process for the Petrochemical Industry: Copyright Material IEEE, Paper No. PCIC-2018-19," 2018 IEEE Petroleum and Chemical Industry Technical Conference (PCIC), Cincinnati, OH, USA, 2018, pp. 163-170.

doi: 10.1109/PCIC31437.2018.9080473

URL: http://ieeexplore.ieee.org/stamp/stamp.jsp?tp=&arnumber=9080473&isnumber=9080428

D. C. Mazur, R. A. Entzminger, P. A. Morell, J. A. Kay and E. Syme, "Defining the industrial demilitarized zone and its benefits for mining applications," 2015 IEEE Industry Applications Society Annual Meeting, Addison, TX, USA, 2015, pp. 1-7.

doi: 10.1109/IAS.2015.7356901

keywords: {Automation;Quality of service;Firewalls (computing);Reconnaissance;Jitter;Industrial Demilitarized Zone (IDMZ);Defense In-Depth Security;Enterprise Zone;Industrial Zone;Virtual Local Area Network (VLAN);Quality of Service (QoS)},

URL: http://ieeexplore.ieee.org/stamp/stamp.jsp?tp=&arnumber=7356901&isnumber=7356738

J. A. Kay, R. A. Entzminger and D. C. Mazur, "Industrial Ethernet- overview and best practices," Conference Record of 2014 Annual Pulp and Paper Industry Technical Conference, Atlanta, GA, USA, 2014, pp. 18-27.

doi: 10.1109/PPIC.2014.6871144

keywords: {Optical fiber cables;IP networks;Cable shielding;Protocols;Media;Optical fiber networks;Ethernet;Ethernet IP;fiber optic;communication media},

URL: http://ieeexplore.ieee.org/stamp/stamp.jsp?tp=&arnumber=6871144&isnumber=6871139

G. A. Hussain, L. Kumpulainen, J. V. Klüss, M. Lehtonen and J. A. Kay, "The Smart Solution for the Prediction of Slowly Developing Electrical Faults in MV Switchgear Using Partial Discharge Measurements," in IEEE Transactions on Power Delivery, vol. 28, no. 4, pp. 2309-2316, Oct. 2013.

doi: 10.1109/TPWRD.2013.2266440

keywords: {Partial discharges;Switchgear;Current measurement;Discharges (electric);Arc discharges;Charge measurement;Monitoring;Arc flash;nonintrusive sensors and partial discharge (PD);online monitoring;switchgear},

URL: http://ieeexplore.ieee.org/stamp/stamp.jsp?tp=&arnumber=6575191&isnumber=6605682

T. Holliday and J. A. Kay, "Understanding infrared windows and their effects on infrared readings," Conference Record of 2013 Annual IEEE Pulp and Paper Industry Technical Conference (PPIC), Charlotte, NC, USA, 2013, pp. 26-33.

doi: 10.1109/PPIC.2013.6656039

keywords: {Calibration;Safety;Cameras;Protocols;Accuracy;Infrared;Sightglass;IR;IR Window;Safety},

URL: http://ieeexplore.ieee.org/stamp/stamp.jsp?tp=&arnumber=6656039&isnumber=6656031

J. A. Kay, L. K. Padden, D. C. Mazur and H. Weber, "The misuse of IEEE device 52-medium voltage contactors & breakers are not the same!," 2016 Petroleum and Chemical Industry Technical Conference (PCIC), Philadelphia, PA, USA, 2016, pp. 1-11.

doi: 10.1109/PCICON.2016.7589223

keywords: {Circuit breakers;Contactors;Interrupters;Vacuum systems;Switching circuits;Vacuum arcs;Circuit Breaker;Vacuum Circuit Breaker;Vacuum Contactor;Vacuum Interrupter;Switchgear;Metal Enclosed;Metal Clad;Arc-Resistant Switchgear},

URL: http://ieeexplore.ieee.org/stamp/stamp.jsp?tp=&arnumber=7589223&isnumber=7589194

J. A. Kay, "Selection, Application, and Interchangeability of Medium-Voltage Power Fuses in Motor Control Centers," in IEEE Transactions on Industry Applications, vol. 42, no. 6, pp. 1574-1581, Nov.-dec. 2006.

doi: 10.1109/TIA.2006.882634

keywords: {Medium voltage;Fuses;Motor drives;Testing;Power system protection;ANSI standards;Pulp and paper industry;Contactors;Control equipment;Stress;E rated;fulgurite;fuse coordination;fuse interchangeability;medium voltage (MV);MV fuses;MV power fuses;power fuses;r rated;x rated},

URL: http://ieeexplore.ieee.org/stamp/stamp.jsp?tp=&arnumber=4012293&isnumber=4012277

G. A. Hussain, L. Kumpulainen, M. Lehtonen and J. A. Kay, "Preemptive Arc-Fault Detection Techniques in Switchgear and Controlgear—Part II," in IEEE Transactions on Industry Applications, vol. 50, no. 3, pp. 1649-1658, May-June 2014.

doi: 10.1109/TIA.2013.2286322

keywords: {Switchgear;Partial discharges;Coils;Discharges (electric);Discrete wavelet transforms;Electric fields;Transient analysis;arc-flash in switchgear;proactive techniques;non-intrusive sensors;online condition monitoring;discrete wavelet transform;Arc flash in switchgear;discrete wavelet transform (DWT);nonintrusive sensors;online condition monitoring;proactive techniques},

URL: http://ieeexplore.ieee.org/stamp/stamp.jsp?tp=&arnumber=6637020&isnumber=6816009

G. A. Hussain, M. Shafiq, J. A. Kay and M. Lehtonen, "Preemptive Arc Fault Detection Techniques in Switchgear—Part III: From the Laboratory to Practical Installation," in IEEE Transactions on Industry Applications, vol. 51, no. 3, pp. 2615-2623, May-June 2015.

doi: 10.1109/TIA.2014.2362958

keywords: {Sensors;Switchgear;Partial discharges;Noise;Laboratories;Discharges (electric);Frequency measurement;arc-flash;switchgear;partial discharge;proactive techniques;non-intrusive sensors;online condition monitoring;on-site measurements;Arc-flash;nonintrusive sensors;online condition monitoring;on-site measurements;partial discharge (PD);proactive techniques;switchgear},

URL: http://ieeexplore.ieee.org/stamp/stamp.jsp?tp=&arnumber=6923467&isnumber=7109193

J. A. Kay, G. A. Hussain, M. Lehtonen and L. Kumpulainen, "New pre-emptive arc fault detection techniques in medium voltage switchgear and motor controls," 2015 61st IEEE Pulp and Paper Industry Conference (PPIC), Milwaukee, WI, USA, 2015, pp. 1-12.

doi: 10.1109/PPIC.2015.7165711

keywords: {Switchgear;Partial discharges;Discharges (electric);Discrete wavelet transforms;Power transformer insulation;Insulation;arc flash;arcing fault;switchgear;motor control center;proactive techniques;non-intrusive sensors;online condition monitoring;signal processing;discrete wavelet transform},

URL: http://ieeexplore.ieee.org/stamp/stamp.jsp?tp=&arnumber=7165711&isnumber=7165702

D. C. Mazur, J. A. Kay and K. D. Mazur, "Intelligent motor control, a definition and value add to process control," 2013 IEEE Industry Applications Society Annual Meeting, Lake Buena Vista, FL, USA, 2013, pp. 1-7.

doi: 10.1109/IAS.2013.6682504

keywords: {Safety;Motor control;Energy efficiency;Manufacturing;Security;International Electrotechnical Commission (IEC) 61850;Safety;Motor Control;Energy Efficiency},

URL: http://ieeexplore.ieee.org/stamp/stamp.jsp?tp=&arnumber=6682504&isnumber=6682441

L. Kumpulainen, J. A. Kay and M. Aurangzeb, "Maximal protection: Lowering incident energy and arc blast elements by minimizing arcing time," 2011 Record of Conference Papers Industry Applications Society 58th Annual IEEE Petroleum and Chemical Industry Conference (PCIC), Toronto, ON, Canada, 2011, pp. 1-6.

doi: 10.1109/PCICon.2011.6085891

keywords: {Arc discharges;Fuses;Circuit faults;Circuit breakers;Protective relaying;Arc flash mitigation;arc eliminator;current limiting fuses;incident energy;pressure wave},

URL: http://ieeexplore.ieee.org/stamp/stamp.jsp?tp=&arnumber=6085891&isnumber=6085853

D. C. Mazur, R. A. Entzminger and J. A. Kay, "Enhancing traditional process SCADA and historians for industrial & commercial power systems with energy (via IEC 61850)," 2014 IEEE/IAS 50th Industrial & Commercial Power Systems Technical Conference, Fort Worth, TX, USA, 2014, pp. 1-7.

doi: 10.1109/ICPS.2014.6839180

keywords: {IEC;Synchronization;Data models;Wires;Market research;Servers;Switches;International Electrotechnical Commission (IEC) 61850;intelligent electronic device;process historian;OLE DB;historical data trending;Supervisory Control and Data Acquisition (SCADA)},

URL: http://ieeexplore.ieee.org/stamp/stamp.jsp?tp=&arnumber=6839180&isnumber=6839152

J. A. Kay and G. K. Schuster, "Enhanced Productivity in Forest Product Industries with Lockout/Tagout Alternatives," 2018 IEEE IAS Pulp, Paper and Forest Industries Conference (PPFIC), Appleton, WI, USA, 2018, pp. 1-5.

doi: 10.1109/PPIC.2018.8502231

keywords: {Lockout;Tagout;LOTO;APM;Safety;Electrical Safety;Machine Safety;OSHA},

URL: http://ieeexplore.ieee.org/stamp/stamp.jsp?tp=&arnumber=8502231&isnumber=8502184

D. C. Mazur, J. A. Kay and K. D. Mazur, "Advancements in vibration monitoring for the mining industry," 2014 IEEE Industry Application Society Annual Meeting, Vancouver, BC, Canada, 2014, pp. 1-8.

doi: 10.1109/IAS.2014.6978459

keywords: {Condition monitoring;Rotors;Vibrations;Machinery;Mining industry;Maintenance engineering;Condition monitoring (CM);Intelligent Motor Control (IMC);Integrated Architecture (IA);Medium Voltage (MV);Motor Control Center (MCC);Vibration Monitoring (VM)},

URL: http://ieeexplore.ieee.org/stamp/stamp.jsp?tp=&arnumber=6978459&isnumber=6978335

R. Paes, J. A. Kay and B. Cassimere, "Applying arc resistant technologies to medium voltage variable frequency drives," 2016 Petroleum and Chemical Industry Technical Conference (PCIC), Philadelphia, PA, USA, 2016, pp. 1-9.

doi: 10.1109/PCICON.2016.7589211

keywords: {Testing;Resistance;IEC Standards;Medium voltage;Switchgear;Variable speed drives;Arc resistant;arc fault;arc flash;switchgear;motor control;medium voltage;variable frequency drives;variable speed drives;controlgear;control equipment},

URL: http://ieeexplore.ieee.org/stamp/stamp.jsp?tp=&arnumber=7589211&isnumber=7589194

J. A. Kay, P. B. Sullivan and M. Wactor, "Installation and Application Considerations of Arc Resistant Medium Voltage Control Equipment," 2007 IEEE Petroleum and Chemical Industry Technical Conference, Calgary, AB, Canada, 2007, pp. 1-8.

doi: 10.1109/PCICON.2007.4365805

keywords: {Medium voltage;Control equipment;Immune system;Protection;Personnel;Electrical safety;Safety devices;Hazards;Explosions;Humans;medium voltage;control equipment;arc resistant;NFPA-70E},

URL: http://ieeexplore.ieee.org/stamp/stamp.jsp?tp=&arnumber=4365805&isnumber=4365767

L. Kumpulainen, G. A. Hussain, M. Lehtonen and J. A. Kay, "Pre-emptive arc fault detection techniques in switchgear and controlgear," 2012 Petroleum and Chemical Industry Conference (PCIC), New Orleans, LA, USA, 2012, pp. 1-9.

doi: 10.1109/PCICON.2012.6549658

keywords: {Arc flash;on-line monitoring;sensors},

URL: http://ieeexplore.ieee.org/stamp/stamp.jsp?tp=&arnumber=6549658&isnumber=6549637

L. R. Olsen, J. A. Kay and M. Van Krey, "Enhanced safety features in motor control centers and drives for diagnostics and troubleshooting," 2015 IEEE IAS Electrical Safety Workshop, Louisville, KY, USA, 2015, pp. 1-9.

doi: 10.1109/ESW.2015.7094870

keywords: {Motor drives;Hazards;Testing;Electric potential;Communication networks;Maintenance engineering;Motor Control Centers (MCCs);Enhanced Safety Features;Diagnostics;Troubleshooting},

URL: http://ieeexplore.ieee.org/stamp/stamp.jsp?tp=&arnumber=7094870&isnumber=7094862

M. R. Bayer, B. G. Stewart, B. K. Venné, D. C. Mazur and J. A. Kay, "Intelligent motor control centers: Defining the benefits to petroleum and chemical industries," 2017 Petroleum and Chemical Industry Technical Conference (PCIC), Calgary, AB, Canada, 2017, pp. 163-174.

doi: 10.1109/PCICON.2017.8188735

keywords: {Motor drives;Process control;Petroleum;Security;Network architecture;Automation;International Electrotechnical Commission (IEC) 61850;Safety;Motor Control;Energy Efficiency;Condition Monitoring},

URL: http://ieeexplore.ieee.org/stamp/stamp.jsp?tp=&arnumber=8188735&isnumber=8188605

J. A. Kay and L. Kumpulainen, "Maximizing protection by minimizing arcing times in medium voltage systems," Conference Record of 2012 Annual IEEE Pulp and Paper Industry Technical Conference (PPIC), Portland, OR, USA, 2012, pp. 1-8.

doi: 10.1109/PPIC.2012.6293013

keywords: {Circuit breakers;Arc discharges;Relays;Circuit faults;Fuses;Limiting;Standards;Arc flash;arc flash mitigation;arc eliminator;arc fault;current limiting fuses;forest products;incident energy;pressure wave},

URL: http://ieeexplore.ieee.org/stamp/stamp.jsp?tp=&arnumber=6293013&isnumber=6292989

J. A. Kay, D. C. Mazur and K. D. Mazur, "Differential protection used with motors, motor controllers and adjustable frequency drives: What you didn't know!," 2015 61st IEEE Pulp and Paper Industry Conference (PPIC), Milwaukee, WI, USA, 2015, pp. 1-9.

doi: 10.1109/PPIC.2015.7165708

keywords: {Current transformers;Circuit faults;Magnetic cores;Power transformers;Fault currents;Mathematical model;Current measurement;Differential Protection;Motor Differential Protection;Magnetizing Current;Core Balance Differential;Transformer Protection;Differential Relay},

URL: http://ieeexplore.ieee.org/stamp/stamp.jsp?tp=&arnumber=7165708&isnumber=7165702

G. A. Hussain, L. Kumpulainen, M. Lehtonen and J. A. Kay, "Pre-emptive arc fault detection techniques in switchgear and controlgear — Part II," Industry Applications Society 60th Annual Petroleum and Chemical Industry Conference, Chicago, IL, USA, 2013, pp. 1-9.

doi: 10.1109/PCICon.2013.6666036

keywords: {Switchgear;Discharges (electric);Partial discharges;Coils;Discrete wavelet transforms;Electric fields;Transient analysis;arc-flash in switchgear;proactive techniques;non-intrusive sensors;online condition monitoring;discrete wavelet transform},

URL: http://ieeexplore.ieee.org/stamp/stamp.jsp?tp=&arnumber=6666036&isnumber=6666008

G. A. Hussain, M. Shafiq, J. A. Kay and M. Lehtonen, "Pre-emptive arc fault detection techniques in switchgear-part III, from the laboratory to practical installation," 2014 IEEE Petroleum and Chemical Industry Technical Conference (PCIC), San Francisco, CA, USA, 2014, pp. 399-407.

doi: 10.1109/PCICon.2014.6961905

keywords: {Sensors;Switchgear;Partial discharges;Noise;Laboratories;Discharges (electric);Insulation;arc-flash;switchgear;partial discharge;proactive techniques;non-intrusive sensors;online condition monitoring;on-site measurements},

URL: http://ieeexplore.ieee.org/stamp/stamp.jsp?tp=&arnumber=6961905&isnumber=6961868

L. K. Padden and J. A. Kay, "New Motor Protection Standard IEEE 3004.8 – Getting Up To Speed!," 2021 IEEE IAS Petroleum and Chemical Industry Technical Conference (PCIC), San Antonio, TX, USA, 2021, pp. 337-346.

doi: 10.1109/PCIC42579.2021.9729011

keywords: {Industrial power systems;Low voltage;Medium voltage;Variable speed drives;IEEE Standards;Petrochemicals;Relays;3004.8;adjustable speed drive;Buff Book;Device 11M;hazardous (classified) locations;motor condition monitoring;motor protection;motor protection relay},

URL: http://ieeexplore.ieee.org/stamp/stamp.jsp?tp=&arnumber=9729011&isnumber=9728980

M. R. Bayer, B. G. Stewart, B. K. Venne, D. C. Mazur and J. A. Kay, "Intelligent Motor Control Centers: Defining the Benefits to Petroleum and Chemical Industries," in IEEE Industry Applications Magazine, vol. 25, no. 5, pp. 47-56, Sept.-Oct. 2019.

doi: 10.1109/MIAS.2018.2875205

keywords: {Process control;Network topology;Petroleum;Security;Switches;Motor drives;Motor control;Intelligent control},

URL: http://ieeexplore.ieee.org/stamp/stamp.jsp?tp=&arnumber=8755840&isnumber=8796465

G. A. Hussain, W. Hassan, F. Mahmood and J. A. Kay, "Separation of Partial Discharge Faults in Metal-clad Switchgear Based on Pulse Shape Analysis," 2022 IEEE Electrical Insulation Conference (EIC), Knoxville, TN, USA, 2022, pp. 323-328.

doi: 10.1109/EIC51169.2022.9833162

keywords: {Partial discharges;Insulation;Shape;Switchgear;Clustering algorithms;Feature extraction;Discharges (electric);Features extraction;K-mean clustering;partial discharge (PD) defects;PD classification;PD pulse shape analysis;switchgear},

URL: http://ieeexplore.ieee.org/stamp/stamp.jsp?tp=&arnumber=9833162&isnumber=9833152

J. A. Kay, R. H. Paes, J. G. Seggewiss and R. G. Ellis, "Methods for the control of large medium-voltage motors: application considerations and guidelines," in IEEE Transactions on Industry Applications, vol. 36, no. 6, pp. 1688-1696, Nov.-Dec. 2000.

doi: 10.1109/28.887223

keywords: {Medium voltage;Guidelines;Induction motors;Petrochemicals;Chemical industry;Electrical equipment industry;Industrial control;Machinery production industries;Fuel economy;Capacitors},

URL: http://ieeexplore.ieee.org/stamp/stamp.jsp?tp=&arnumber=887223&isnumber=19171

J. A. Kay, R. H. Paes, J. G. Seggewiss and R. G. Ellis, "Methods for the control of large medium voltage motors; application considerations and guidelines," Industry Applications Society 46th Annual Petroleum and Chemical Technical Conference (Cat.No. 99CH37000), San Diego, CA, USA, 1999, pp. 345-353.

doi: 10.1109/PCICON.1999.806453

keywords: {Voltage control;Medium voltage;Induction motors;Petrochemicals;Chemical industry;Electrical equipment industry;Industrial control;Machinery production industries;Guidelines;Fuel economy},

URL: http://ieeexplore.ieee.org/stamp/stamp.jsp?tp=&arnumber=806453&isnumber=17478

A. J. Holliday and J. A. Kay, "Utilizing Infrared Sightglasses to Protect Against Arc-Flash Exposure," Conference Record of 2006 Annual Pulp and Paper Industry Technical Conference, Appleton, WI, USA, 2006, pp. 1-10.

doi: 10.1109/PAPCON.2006.1673784

keywords: {Protection;Inspection;Hazards;Protective clothing;Occupational safety;Testing;Resistance;Manufacturing;Cotton;Fires;Sightglass;infrared;infrared windows;infrared ports;arc resistant;arc flash;arc flash hazards;arcing},

URL: http://ieeexplore.ieee.org/stamp/stamp.jsp?tp=&arnumber=1673784&isnumber=35129

J. A. Kay, "Testing and Certification of Medium Voltage Control Centers to Arc Resistant Standards," Conference Record of 2006 Annual Pulp and Paper Industry Technical Conference, Appleton, WI, USA, 2006, pp. 1-10.

doi: 10.1109/PAPCON.2006.1673785

keywords: {Testing;Certification;Medium voltage;Voltage control;Immune system;Protection;Personnel;Hazards;Control equipment;Electrical safety;Arc resistant;arc tests;arc flash;arc flash hazards;arcing;explosion;motor control;medium voltage},

URL: http://ieeexplore.ieee.org/stamp/stamp.jsp?tp=&arnumber=1673785&isnumber=35129

A. J. Holliday and J. A. Kay, "The use of infrared viewing systems in electrical control equipment," Conference Record of 2005 Annual Pulp and Paper Industry Technical Conference, 2005., Jacksonville, FL, USA, 2005, pp. 291-295.

doi: 10.1109/PAPCON.2005.1502078

keywords: {Control equipment;Cameras;Personnel;Infrared spectra;Inspection;Infrared imaging;Costs;Predictive maintenance;Infrared detectors;Infrared heating},

URL: http://ieeexplore.ieee.org/stamp/stamp.jsp?tp=&arnumber=1502078&isnumber=32160

B. Tjahjono, P. Ball, J. Ladbrook and J. Kay, "Assembly line design principles using Six Sigma and simulation," Proceedings of the 2009 Winter Simulation Conference (WSC), Austin, TX, USA, 2009, pp. 3066-3076.

doi: 10.1109/WSC.2009.5429219

keywords: {Six sigma;Engines;Workstations;Design engineering;Robotic assembly;Virtual manufacturing;Production facilities;Productivity;Process design;Assembly systems},

URL: http://ieeexplore.ieee.org/stamp/stamp.jsp?tp=&arnumber=5429219&isnumber=5429163

J. A. Kay, "Selection, application and interchangeability of medium voltage power fuses in motor control centers," Conference Record of 2005 Annual Pulp and Paper Industry Technical Conference, 2005., Jacksonville, FL, USA, 2005, pp. 95-104.

doi: 10.1109/PAPCON.2005.1502054

keywords: {Medium voltage;Fuses;Motor drives;Testing;IEC standards;Circuits;Power system protection;ANSI standards;Voltage control;IEEE members},

URL: http://ieeexplore.ieee.org/stamp/stamp.jsp?tp=&arnumber=1502054&isnumber=32160

J. A. Kay, "The Pulp and Paper Industry Committee [IAS History]," in IEEE Industry Applications Magazine, vol. 21, no. 1, pp. 76-77, JANUARY/FEBRUARY 2015.

doi: 10.1109/MIAS.2014.2362030

URL: http://ieeexplore.ieee.org/stamp/stamp.jsp?tp=&arnumber=6978680&isnumber=6978588

Publications, Magazine Articles 

 Surviving Arc Flash, Electrical Construction & Maintenance (EC&M);  https://www.ecmweb.com/around-the-circuit/article/20898242/surviving-arc-flash 
 Arc-resistant 50kA regenerative drive is ‘a first’,   Drives & Controls;  https://drivesncontrols.com/news/fullstory.php/aid/4927/Arc-resistant_50kA_regenerative_drive_is__91a_first_92.html
 Advances In Arc-Resistant Motor Control Equipment, Efficient Plant;  https://www.efficientplantmag.com/2007/05/advances-in-arc-resistant-motor-control-equipment/ 
 Reduce Arc Flash Risks With Motor Control Centers, EHS Today;   https://www.ehstoday.com/arc-flash/article/21154204/reduce-arc-flash-risks-with-motor-control-centers 
 Arc flash blowout, Control Engineering;  https://www.controleng.com/articles/arc-flash-blowout/

Books 
 Medium Voltage: Its Use, Control and Applications,   ₢ 1998, 1999, 2000; Rockwell Automation Canada, Pub # 1500-RM001A-EN-P

 The Principle Elements of Medium Voltage Motor Controllers, ₢ 1998, 1999, 2000; Rockwell Automation Canada, Pub # 1500-RM002A-EN-P

Patents 
US0000D0816093S120180424 (storage.googleapis.com) - DISPLAY SCREEN OR PORTION THEREOF WITH GRAPHICAL USER INTERFACE 

US0000D0816094S120180424 (storage.googleapis.com) - DISPLAY SCREEN OR PORTION THEREOF WITH GRAPHICAL USER INTERFACE

US0000D0816096S120180424 (storage.googleapis.com) - DISPLAY SCREEN OR PORTION THEREOF  WITH GRAPHICAL USER INTERFACE 

https://patentimages.storage.googleapis.com/ec/86/04/167c51a7b99aa0/USD816096.pdf

US0000D0816095S120180424 (storage.googleapis.com) - DISPLAY SCREEN OR PORTION THEREOF WITH GRAPHICAL USER INTERFACE

US020170075320A120170316 (storage.googleapis.com) - INDUSTRIAL AUTOMATION PACKAGED POWER SOLUTION FOR INTELLIGENT MOTOR CONTROL AND INTELLIGENT SWITCHGEAR WITH ENERGY MANAGEMENT

References

Fellow Members of the IEEE
Living people
Year of birth missing (living people)
Place of birth missing (living people)